Alfredo Gómez Sánchez (born 7 March 1968) is a Mexican politician affiliated with the Institutional Revolutionary Party.  he served as Deputy of the LIX Legislature of the Mexican Congress representing the State of Mexico.

References

1968 births
Living people
Politicians from the State of Mexico
Institutional Revolutionary Party politicians
Deputies of the LIX Legislature of Mexico
Members of the Chamber of Deputies (Mexico) for the State of Mexico